Pundalik Narayan Naik (born 21 April 1952) is a Konkani-language poet, short-story writer, novelist, playwright, and screenwriter from Goa. He has 40 books and two films to his credit.

Achievements
He served as the President of Goa Konkani Akademi (Goa Academy of Letters for Konkani) of the Government of Goa since 2002.

His novel Acchev (The Upheaval, 1977), the first Konkani novel to be translated into English, is considered a landmark in the history of the language. It is a story based in a Goa wrecked by rampant mining. Acchev has been described as a novel which "describes peasant life in the Ponda [sub-]district and shows what happens when a traditional society that lives by myths and rituals comes into contact with modern mechanised ways of life."

Manohar Shetty, in a review in the Deccan Herald, writes: "Pundalik Naik's novel is set in this grim backdrop, chronicling in detail the decay of a self-sufficient agricultural community with the impassive invasion of the mining industry. Naik's novel, the first to be translated from Konkani, created something of a sensation when it appeared in 1977. No other writer in Goa had portrayed in such graphic and brutal detail the ruinous fallouts on small agricultural holdings by the bulldozers of big industry. Pandhari, the protagonist of the novel, is the first to fall into the tempting shaft. Just before the auspicious day of sowing, Babuso, a wily and unscrupulous go-between, approaches him for his services as a load-bearer and to hire his bullock-cart to carry ore from the mines. Pandhari succumbs to the allure of quick money and in an instant becomes a bonded labourer and the bullocks, which once ploughed the life-sustaining fields, become a transport vehicle, the cart laden with the metallic spoils of the pillaged land."

Notable works
In all, Naik has 32 plays, and collections of short stories, novels, novellas, translations and books of children's rhyme to his credit. He is considered a pioneer in the realm of Konkani drama.

Some of his plays are as follows:

Some have complained that "his works are pretty difficult to bring into English and other languages". There is also an essay (translated into English by Vidya Pai) explaining how Naik's Acchev happened. This essay (in Konkani) was originally published in the special issue of the Konkani literary magazine Jaag released to celebrate 150 years of the Konkani novel in early 2012.

During a five-day theatre festival on the plays of Pundalik Naik, called Natyarang Pancham, held in 2011, the plays staged were Shabay Shabay Bhaujan Samaj, Kaansulo, Suring, Chaityanak Math Naa and Shree Vichitrachi Jatra.

Naik took to writing plays in 1977. The Shubham Naik Trust and the Directorate of Art and Culture had organised a festival of selected Konkani plays of Pundalik Naik at five regional centers including Masordem—Sattari, Mandrem—Pernem, Sanguem, Chaudi—Canacona and Shiroda—Ponda.

Works in translation
Upheaval (Achhev), tr. by Vidya Pai. Oxford University Press, 2002. .

Awards
He was awarded the Sahitya Akademi Award in Konkani for his work, Chowrang, in 1984, by Sahitya Akademi, India's National Academy of Letters. He was awarded the Gomant Sharda Puraskar for Lifetime Achievement in 2010.

He has edited an anthology, Chowrang, for which he got the Sahitya Akademi Award in 1984. Besides, he has been bestowed the AIR's Playwright Award (1986, 1987), the Paters Award of the Australian Academy of Broadcasting and Science (1988), the Government of Goa award for children's drama (1975), and the Konkani Bhasha Mandal Prize. In 2013, the Sangeet Natak Akademi award came on account of his contribution to Indian theatre as a playwright.

Personal life
Naik was born on 21 April 1952, in Volvoi village of Ponda taluka of Goa. He started his career as a school teacher (1972–78), joined All India Radio, Panjim, as a sub-editor in 1979, and later worked there as an assistant editor in charge of scripts. In 1984, he left All India Radio to become a full-time writer, and has 32 plays to his credit. He is married to Hema Naik, also a Konkani writer. He played a prominent role in the Konkani language agitation (1985–87) in Goa. He was the Convenor of the Konkani Porjecho Avaz, a campaign group promoting the cause of the Konkani language at the time.

Naik has also written plays for radio and television, and has edited films.

References

Notes

External links
 Extract from Acchev
 Translation of Pundalik Naik's essay on Acchev, by Vidya Pai
 Excerpts from The Upheaval, by Pundalik Naik in Frontline
 Five-day festival of Pundalik Naik's plays, 2011
 Dr Maria Couto on Pundalik Naik's appeal
 Kittall Cafe with Pundalik Naik
 The Hindu review of The Upheaval
 GSBKonkani on Acchev
 Review of The Upheaval in Indian Literature

1952 births
Living people
Poets from Goa
Indian male dramatists and playwrights
Konkani-language writers
Konkani people
Recipients of the Sahitya Akademi Award in Konkani
Indian male short story writers
Konkani short story writers
Konkani-language poets
Indian male poets
People from Panaji
20th-century Indian dramatists and playwrights
20th-century Indian poets
20th-century Indian short story writers
Dramatists and playwrights from Goa
20th-century Indian male writers
Recipients of the Sangeet Natak Akademi Award